Mary Beth Bowie (born 27 October 1978) is a Canadian women's international footballer who played as a midfielder. She has competed for the Canada women's national soccer team. She was part of the team at the 1999 FIFA Women's World Cup.

Born in Halifax, Nova Scotia, Bowie grew up in Dartmouth and attended Dalhousie University, before playing for the Connecticut Huskies women's soccer program in the U.S. Overall, Bowie made 13 appearances for the Canadian national team, including five starts.

Bowie played for the Boston Renegades in the W League, and followed that up by playing locally with Scotia Soccer Club, Athens Soccer Club and Halifax City Soccer Club.

References

1978 births
Living people
1999 FIFA Women's World Cup players
Canada women's international soccer players
Canadian women's soccer players
UConn Huskies women's soccer players
Dalhousie University alumni
Soccer people from Nova Scotia
Sportspeople from Dartmouth, Nova Scotia
Sportspeople from Halifax, Nova Scotia
Women's association football midfielders
USL W-League (1995–2015) players
Boston Renegades players
Canadian expatriate sportspeople in the United States
Expatriate women's soccer players in the United States